Barry Rowan (born 24 April 1942) is an English former professional footballer who played as a winger, most notably in the Football League for Exeter City and Millwall. He also played in the United States and South Africa.

Career statistics

Honours 
Millwall
 Football League Third Division second-place promotion: 1965–66
 Football League Fourth Division second-place promotion: 1964–65
Oakland Clippers
 National Professional Soccer League: 1967
Dallas Tornado
 North American Soccer League: 1971

References

External links

1942 births
Living people
Footballers from Willesden
English footballers
Brentford F.C. players
Millwall F.C. players
Colchester United F.C. players
Reading F.C. players
Plymouth Argyle F.C. players
Exeter City F.C. players
Poole Town F.C. players
English Football League players
Association football wingers
Dover F.C. players
Southern Football League players
Oakland Clippers players
Detroit Cougars (soccer) players
Middlesbrough F.C. players
Durban United F.C. players
Dallas Tornado players
Toronto Blizzard (1971–1984) players
English expatriate footballers
English expatriate sportspeople in the United States
North American Soccer League (1968–1984) players
Expatriate soccer players in the United States
English expatriate sportspeople in South Africa
Expatriate soccer players in South Africa
National Football League (South Africa) players
Watford F.C. players
English expatriate sportspeople in Canada
Expatriate soccer players in Canada